Cartmel Racecourse is a small national hunt racecourse in the village of Cartmel, now in the ceremonial county of Cumbria, historically in Lancashire. Nine racedays are held each year, starting on the Whit Holiday weekend at the end of May and ending on the August Bank Holiday weekend in August Bank Holidays.

The three-day May race meeting actually takes place over five days – allowing a day off for racegoers to enjoy the Lake District countryside in between each day at the races. The racegoers arrive so early in the day and leave so late that, unlike most racecourses, there is not time to clear up and turn the racecourse around for consecutive days racing.

The two-day July meeting (taking place over three days, with a day off in-between) features the most valuable race at Cartmel, the Cumbria Crystal Hurdle Race, which is worth over £40,000.

The August racemeeting features the Cartmel Cup (a hurdle race) and the Cavendish Cup (a steeplechase).

Although the racecourse is considered to be small, it often has the third-highest average attendance of any jumps track in Britain after Aintree and Cheltenham – the largest crowds can be just over 20,000 on one day. The visitors gather in the centre of the racecourse which is bisected by the finishing straight. On one side of the straight is a very large fairground and on the other the Parade Ring and Winners' Enclosure. There is a small grandstand, but in general most of the facilities at Cartmel are temporary. The village shops are a short walk from the track and a visit to the village is often considered to be a significant part of a day at Cartmel races.

Cartmel Racecourse is noted as having a four-furlong run-in on the Steeplechase course, the longest in Britain. The run in on the Hurdle track is slightly less than 2 furlongs. All winning connections receive a Cartmel Sticky Toffee Pudding to take home.

The earliest written account of racing at Cartmel dates back to 1856, although it was certainly in action prior to that date. The course was supported by local landowners. Until World War II it was a very small course featuring primarily amateur jockeys, but in the second half of the 20th century the racing programme was expanded and professionalised. Cartmel Racecourse and its surrounding land have long been owned by the Holker Estate, where the Cavendish family still reside. Hugh Cavendish became a Director on the Board of Cartmel Racecourse in 1974 and in 1998, bought out the management team to develop it further under the guidance of his allies at Aintree. This has seen the course go from strength-to-strength, and it continues to grow in stature and service year-on-year.

Cartmel was the site of the Gay Future 'coup' in 1974 that involved switching horses before a race and relying on the lack of communications at the course.

The most popular racehorse at Cartmel in recent seasons is Soul Magic, who has won at the track on seven occasions - prior to the 2014 racing season.

References

External links 
 
 Course guide on GG.COM
 Course guide on At The Races

Horse racing venues in England
Sports venues in Cumbria
1856 establishments in England
Event venues established in 1856
Sports venues completed in 1856
Cartmel